Neopseustis is a genus of moths in the family Neopseustidae.

Species
Neopseustis archiphenax Meyrick, 1928
Neopseustis bicornuta D.R. Davis, 1975
Neopseustis calliglauca Meyrick, 1909
Neopseustis fanjingshana Yang, 1988
Neopseustis meyricki Hering, 1925
Neopseustis moxiensis Chen & Owada, 2009
Neopseustis sinensis D.R. Davis, 1975

External links
Systematics and Zoogeography of the Family Neopseustidae with the Proposal of a New Superfamily (Lepidoptera: Neopseustoidea)

Neopseustidae
Moth genera
Glossata genera